Igor Vladimirovich Lebedev (born 27 September 1972) is a Russian politician. He is a former deputy of the State Duma, a Deputy Chairman of the Duma, and chairman of the populist Liberal Democratic Party of Russia's Duma parliamentary group, and of the Liberal Democratic Party of Russia's Youth Organization. He was a member of the State Duma's Committees on Budget Issues and Taxes, and State Building and Legislation. His father was Vladimir Zhirinovsky, chairman of the Liberal Democratic Party of Russia.

As of 12 September 2014, Lebedev was sanctioned by the European Union for voting "... in favour of the draft Federal Constitutional Law ‘on the acceptance into the Russian Federation of the Republic of Crimea and the formation within the Russian Federation of new federal subjects - the republic of Crimea and the City of Federal Status Sevastopol’."

Controversy
Following supporter violence involving Russian fans at the Euro 2016 tournament, Lebedev tweeted "nothing wrong with fans fighting" and to "keep up the good work".

In March 2017, Lebedev proposed legalising football hooliganism and turning it into a sport.

References 

1972 births
Living people
Politicians from Moscow
People of the annexation of Crimea by the Russian Federation
Russian people of Polish-Jewish descent
Liberal Democratic Party of Russia politicians
21st-century Russian politicians
Third convocation members of the State Duma (Russian Federation)
Fourth convocation members of the State Duma (Russian Federation)
Fifth convocation members of the State Duma (Russian Federation)
Sixth convocation members of the State Duma (Russian Federation)
Seventh convocation members of the State Duma (Russian Federation)
Kutafin Moscow State Law University alumni
Russian individuals subject to European Union sanctions